Zaal (born c.1428 – died after 1442) was a Georgian royal prince (batonishvili) of the Bagrationi dynasty.

Son of Alexander I of Georgia and co-king with his father in 1433.

His name "Zaal" is derived from the Persian Zāl, a name of the legendary king and warrior from Ferdowsi's Shahnameh.

References

Sources
Cyrille Toumanoff, Les dynasties de la Caucasie chrétienne de l'Antiquité jusqu'au XIXe siècle: Tables généalogiques et chronologiques, Rome, 1990, p. 139-140.

1428 births
1442 deaths
Bagrationi dynasty of the Kingdom of Georgia
Georgian princes
15th-century people from Georgia (country)